Spiceworld: The Exhibition is a touring museum exhibition displaying a collection of around 5,000 Spice Girls memorabilia and merchandise owned by Liz West, the Guinness World Record holder for the largest collection of Spice Girls memorabilia. The exhibition was launched at Cusworth Hall in Doncaster, England, and has since appeared at museums across the UK, including the Leeds City Museum, Tower Museum and the Watford Colosseum.

Exhibition contents and history
Spiceworld: The Exhibition displays a collection of around 5,000 Spice Girls costumes, footwear, merchandise and memorabilia.  It includes outfits the group wore in live performances and concert tours, including several customised platform shoes, as well as a "Sporty Spice" tracksuit contributed by Spice Girl Melanie C. It also includes an extensive range of Spice Girls merchandise. The interactive exhibition allows visitors to sing karaoke, dress up as the Spice Girls, and design a Spice Girls album cover.

The exhibition was first launched at the Cusworth Hall in Doncaster, England, in 2008. West's collection was not displayed in its entirety until the exhibition opened at the Leeds City Museum in 2011. It received almost 50,000 visitors at the Leeds City Museum, making it the best-attended exhibition in the museum's history.

Locations

References

Works about the Spice Girls
Museum events
Traveling exhibits
2008 establishments
Exhibitions in the United Kingdom